BlazBlue: Cross Tag Battle is a 2D crossover fighting game developed and published by Arc System Works, first released for PlayStation 4, Nintendo Switch and Windows in 2018. Cross Tag Battle features characters from different series, including BlazBlue, Persona 4 Arena, Under Night In-Birth and RWBY. After the game was released, characters from Arcana Heart, Senran Kagura, and Akatsuki Blitzkampf, were added as downloadable content. An arcade version was released in 2019 in Japan. A version of the base game was made available for Amazon Luna in February 2021. The Special Edition with all post-launch content is set to be released for Xbox One and Xbox Series X/S in Q2 2023. The game received mostly positive reviews, with praise for the visuals, music, online functionality and mechanics. However, it was criticised for lack of overall content at launch and DLC practices.

Gameplay
BlazBlue Cross Tag Battle is a 2D fighting game that puts the focus on tag team mechanics. In its main modes players battle in 2-vs-2 matches: they control one of the two selected characters at a time, and are able to switch between them on command. In addition to the standard fighting game meter that is expended to perform special and EX moves, the game features another resource: the assist meter. If they have enough, players can also have the second character use assist attacks to extend combos, keep the opponent away, or alternatively use all meter on "Cross Burst" to escape from dangerous situations. Similar to Marvel vs. Capcom, even if one character on the team loses all of their health, the match continues until both are down.

To accommodate for the tag mechanics and make characters easier to learn, the controls were simplified compared to mainline BlazBlue games and other participating series. In addition, each character was given some universal options, such as an overhead with the heavy button, invincible reversal attack, and auto combos.

Each participating sides have exclusive universal traits and features from their home series respectively, similar to Capcom Fighting Evolution, such as Persona side's Persona system, French-Bread game titles sides' Reverse Beat chain combo functions, Akatsuki Blitzkampf side's Reflector, .etc. Though some of the home series-based mechanics are being reworked and simplified for this game, such as Persona side's Persona Break now has the user receives a damage on their health bar when their Persona is being hit by an attack like in Persona 4 The Animation.

Plot
A singularity called the "Phantom Field" mixes the reality of the world with other universes. When the "Keystone" divides into four fragments, the female voice system known as "System XX" instructs one of the main characters to keep it away from others and reach the goal, gathering all characters to join the battle, who hopes to separately return home to each universe. After all fragments merged into one, they prevent the system from changing the universe. 

However, the next episode of the storyline ends with Hazama Honoka came into possession of the primary keystone containing the system itself, where he attempt to use it to hijack on the Takemagahara System. Unfortunately, Takemagahara detects the remnants of late Yūki Terumi within him and copy his gene to create the clone of Terumi’s Susano’o form as a countermeasure, but indirectly led to the destruction of multiverse. While System XX hold off the clone from being unleashed, a regretful Hazama took over the role as the multiversal tournament’s conductor at the former’s behest. As System XX cannot hold off the Susano’o clone much longer, Hazama changes the contest that was solely a Tag Battle-themed keystone hunting into multiple-themed stamp collecting, in addition to bring characters three more universes, in hopes for the winners to assist him and System to defeat the clone. Despite the Susano’o clone was defeated by Ragna the Bloodedge and Naoto Kurogane, System XX is unable to return the characters to their respective universes, due to being critically weakened from holding off the clone. The storyline concludes with the characters participate the endless Tag Team-based Battle Royale, while awaiting for System XX’s full recovery.

Characters

The game started out with twenty characters in the base game. A further twenty became available as "Season 1" DLC. On June 7, 2018, Minoru Kidooka confirmed that "Season 2" DLC will be added for arcade edition in April 2019 and for the console version in May 2019. Blake Belladonna and Yang Xiao Long were added as free downloadable content, while other characters are available at a cost. In the PC version's release, Blake was available at launch as the 21st base character, while Yang was added via update patch, leaving only eighteen characters of Season 1 DLC. Naoto Kurogane, Teddie, Seth and Heart Aino, were added to Season 2 DLC for free at the launch of the arcade version and as paid content during the release of the console version's 1.5 patch. The full version of Season 2, the Special Edition, would be announced to include battle changes, new story content, and the inclusion of the characters, Celica A. Mercury, Susano'o, Elizabeth, Tohru Adachi, Hilda and Neo Politan. Also in full version Season 2, Senran Kagura and Akatsuki Blitzkampf (counting its sequel EN-Eins Perfektewelt) were added as sixth and seventh franchises, adding Yumi, Akatsuki and Blitztank respectively. There are 53 characters in total after the conclusion of Season 2.

Notes:
‡ Free downloadable content character

Development
In a 2016 interview with Forbes, Toshimichi Mori revealed his interest for Rooster Teeth and RWBY. Before the game was released, Rooster Teeth teased the possibility of a RWBY fighting game being revealed at Evo 2017 on their Twitter account. On July 16, 2017, the game was announced at the Evo 2017 championships following Ryusei Ito's victory in BlazBlue: Central Fiction. Ragna the Bloodedge, Jin Kisaragi, Yu Narukami, Hyde Kido and Ruby Rose appeared in the game on the announcement trailer. Konomi Higuchi served as a character designer. According to Mori, Cross Tag Battle was designed for home consoles, although the arcade version was announced. Arc System Works published the game in most territories, while PQube released the console versions in Europe. A version for Amazon Luna was released on February 18, 2021.

According to Mori, the game's target userbase is for English players. Cross Tag Battle is the first BlazBlue game since Chrono Phantasma to be dubbed into English, with an option to toggle between English and Japanese voices on each characters. The arcade port features support for USB controllers.

Pre-release, Arc System Works announced that there would be twenty paid downloadable content characters for the first season of the game, resulting in Cross Tag Battle launching with only half of its planned roster at twenty. This caused backlash from fans, with the arguments that the game reused assets from the past fighting games, and that half of Team RWBY would be sold separately. In response, Mori announced that Blake and Yang would be released free of charge. In addition, he stated that costs for the characters would not exceed that of the game's base retail cost. Post-release, Arc System Works revealed a teaser trailer for a fifth franchise to be included, later revealed to be Arcana Heart at EVO Japan 2019. The sixth and seventh franchises, Senran Kagura and Akatsuki Blitzkampf/EN-Eins Perfektewelt, were revealed at EVO 2019.

At CEO 2021, it was revealed that the PlayStation 4 and Steam versions of the game were patched with rollback netcode in 2022. At Tokyo Game Show 2022, it was announced that the Special Edition of the game, containing all post-release downloadable content, will launch for Xbox One and Xbox Series X/S in Q2 2023.

Reception

The game sold 11,696 copies for PlayStation 4 and 4,271 copies on Nintendo Switch in Japan. The game received mostly positive reviews, with praise for visuals, music, online functionality and game mechanics, but criticism of its lack of overall content at launch and its downloadable content (DLC) practices. Famitsu awarded it a score of 35/40.

The game was nominated for "Best Fighting Game" at The Game Awards 2018, for "Fan Favorite Fighting Game" at the Gamers' Choice Awards, for "Best Fighting Game" at the Titanium Awards, for the Raging Bull Award for Best Fighting Game at the New York Game Awards, and for "Fighting Game of the Year" at the D.I.C.E. Awards.

The game had sold over 450,000 copies worldwide in June 2020.

Notes

References

External links

 (Japanese)

2018 video games
2D fighting games
ALL.Net games
Arc System Works games
Arcade video games
Arcana Heart
BlazBlue
Crossover fighting games
Fighting games used at the Evolution Championship Series tournament
Fighting games
Multiplayer and single-player video games
NESiCAxLive games
Nintendo Switch games
Persona (series)
PlayStation 4 games
RWBY
Senran Kagura
Tag team videogames
Video games about parallel universes
Video games developed in Japan
Windows games
Xbox One games
Xbox Series X and Series S games
PQube games